There are several New York zoos:

 in New York City
 The Bronx Zoo, the city's main zoo
 The Central Park Zoo, Manhattan
 The Queens Zoo (Flushing Meadow Zoo)
 The Prospect Park Zoo, Brooklyn
 The Staten Island Zoo, the North Shore, Staten Island

 in New York State
 The Buffalo Zoo in the city of Buffalo
 The Zoo New York in Thompson Park located in Watertown, Jefferson County

Zoos in New York (state)